Christian Heritage College may refer to:

 Christian Heritage College, Brisbane, Australia
 San Diego Christian College